State Road 58 (NM 58) is a state highway in the US state of New Mexico. NM 58's western terminus is at U.S. Route 64 (US 64), and the  eastern terminus is at Interstate 25 (I-25).

Major intersections

See also

References

058
058
058